There Is Nothing for You Here: Finding Opportunity in the 21st Century is a 2021 political memoir by British-American political advisor Fiona Hill. It details her early life in England, entering US politics, and continues through the presidency of Donald Trump.

References

2021 non-fiction books
Mariner Books books